Zaldapa Ridge (‘Rid Zaldapa’ \'rid zal-'da-pa\) is the predominantly ice-free ridge extending 6 km in east-west direction and 1.7 km wide on Yatrus Promontory in Graham Land, Antarctica, with its twin rocky summits rising to 385 (the west one) and 365 m respectively. The feature ends at Jade Point on the east.

The ridge is named “after the ancient Thracian and Roman town of Zaldapa in Northeastern Bulgaria”.

Location
German-British mapping in 1996.

Maps
 Trinity Peninsula. Scale 1:250000 topographic map No. 5697. Institut für Angewandte Geodäsie and British Antarctic Survey, 1996.
 Antarctic Digital Database (ADD). Scale 1:250000 topographic map of Antarctica. Scientific Committee on Antarctic Research (SCAR). Since 1993, regularly updated.

Notes

References
 Bulgarian Antarctic Gazetteer. Antarctic Place-names Commission. (details in Bulgarian, basic data in English)

External links
 Zaldapa Ridge. Copernix satellite image

Ridges of Graham Land
Landforms of Trinity Peninsula
Bulgaria and the Antarctic